Caralluma crenulata is a succulent, superficially cactus-like species in the plant family Apocynaceae, genus Caralluma.

It is native to Myanmar and is cultivated in gardens around the world for its red and yellow striped flowers.

References

External links 
 Caralluma crenulata at ZipcodeZoo

Asclepiadoideae
Flora of Myanmar
Plants described in 1829